God bless you (variants include God bless or bless you) is a common English expression generally used to wish a person blessings in various situations, especially to "will the good of another person", as a response to a sneeze, and also, when parting or writing a valediction.
The phrase has been used in the Hebrew Bible by Jews (cf. ), and by Christians, since the time of the early Church as a benediction, as well as a means of bidding a person Godspeed. Many clergy, when blessing their congregants individually or as a group, use the phrase "God bless you".

Origins and legends

The locution "God bless you" is used in Christian benedictions. In the Aaronic blessing, "Invoking the name of the Lord in this benediction transferred the name, the identity and presence, of God onto his people." While used by clergy in Christian liturgy (especially during the benediction), the phrase "God bless you" is regularly used among believers with one another, who call upon God to grant the recipient of the phrase favour and protection. In the periodical Christianity Today, the philosopher Dallas Willard wrote:

National Geographic reports that during the Roman Plague of 590, "Pope Gregory I ordered unceasing prayer for divine intercession. Part of his command was that anyone sneezing be blessed immediately ("God bless you"), since sneezing was often the first sign that someone was falling ill with the plague." By AD 750, it became customary to say "God bless you" as a response to one sneezing.

Some have offered an explanation suggesting that people once held the folk belief that a person's soul could be thrown from their body when they sneezed, that sneezing otherwise opened the body to invasion by the Devil or evil spirits, or that sneezing was the body's effort to force out an invading evil presence. In these cases, "God bless you" or "bless you" is used as a sort of shield against evil. The Irish Folk story "Master and Man" by Thomas Crofton Croker, collected by William Butler Yeats, describes this variation. Moreover, in the past some people may have thought that the heart stops beating during a sneeze, and that the phrase "God bless you" encourages the heart to continue beating.

In some cultures, sneezing is seen as a sign of good fortune or God's beneficence. Alternative responses to sneezing exist in various languages.

See also
Blessing
Benediction
Christmas Is Coming
Response to sneezing
Sacramental

References

 Opie, Iona, and Moira Tatem. A Dictionary of Superstitions. Oxford University Press; Oxford, 1992. 

English phrases
Parting phrases
Parting traditions